The year 1687 in science and technology involved some significant events.

Astronomy
 The constellation Triangulum Minus is named by Johannes Hevelius.

Biology
 Alida Withoos at the house of Agnes Block makes a painting of the first pineapple bred in Europe.

Medicine
 Dutch physician Willem ten Rhijne publishes Verhandelinge van de Asiatise Melaatsheid na een naaukeuriger ondersoek ten dienste van het gemeen in Amsterdam, explaining Asian leprosy to the West.

Physics
 July 5 – Isaac Newton's Philosophiæ Naturalis Principia Mathematica, known as the  Principia, is published by the Royal Society of London. In it, Newton describes his theory of universal gravitation, explains the laws of mechanics (including Newton's laws of motion), gives a formula for the speed of sound and demonstrates that Earth is an oblate spheroid. The concepts in the Principia become the foundations of modern physics.

Births
 October 14 – Robert Simson, Scottish mathematician (died 1768).

Deaths
 January 28 – Johannes Hevelius, German astronomer (born 1611).

 
17th century in science
1680s in science